Xanthoparmelia isidiovagans is a species of foliose lichen in the family Parmeliaceae

Description
It contains several secondary compounds, including stictic acid as a major metabolite, usnic acid, norstictic acid, constictic acid, and cryptostictic acid as minor metabolites, and trace amounts of peristictic acid.

Taxonomy
Found in Spain, it was formally described as a new species in 2005 by lichenologists Oscar Blanco, Ana Crespo, Pradeep Divakar, and John Elix. The specific epithet isidiovagans alludes to its resemblance to the American species Xanthoparmelia vagans, from which it differs by the presence of isidia.

See also
List of Xanthoparmelia species

References

isidiovagans
Lichen species
Lichens described in 2005
Lichens of Southwestern Europe
Taxa named by Ana Crespo
Taxa named by Pradeep Kumar Divakar
Taxa named by John Alan Elix